The Tatra 613 is a large luxury rear wheel driven car with rear-mounted air-cooled engine manufactured by Czechoslovak manufacturer Tatra from 1974 until 1996 as a replacement for the Tatra 603 series.

The design was updated a further five times until being replaced by the Tatra 700 in 1996, itself a restyled T613-5.

The Tatra 613 vehicles were mostly used by government officials, industry executives and in limited numbers were also used as police cars and as the rapid response fire fighting and rescue vehicles during motorsport events.

Specifications 
 engine type and layout: Tatra 613, air-cooled V8 2x DOHC (four camshafts total) 
 displacement: 3495 cc (3.5L), bore: 85 mm, stroke: 77 mm
 maximum power :  at 5200 rpm,  at 5750 rpm (injection version)
 maximum torque :  at 3330 rpm,  (injection version)
 top speed: 190 km/h, 230 km/h (injection version)
 0–100 km/h: 11.4 s (carburetted 613-4)

Versions 
1975 - 1980 Tatra 613 - 4581 vehicles produced
1980 - 1984 Tatra 613-2 (changes in automotive parts, fuel economy) - 1045 vehicles produced
1985 - 1991 Tatra 613-3 (1st facelift by V.Výborný) - 903 vehicles produced
1991 - 1993 Tatra 613 RTP and RZP (ambulance)
1991 - 1996 Tatra 613-4 and Tatra 613-4 Long (2nd facelift, first injection version) - 191 vehicles produced
1993 - 1994 Tatra 613-5 - only four prototypes were ever made, a fuel-injected 'westernised' car having been contracted out to ex-Jaguar development engineer Tim Bishop from England.
1993 - 1996 Tatra 613-4 Mi and Tatra 613-4 Mi Long (luxury version) - 109 vehicles produced + several dozens of long versions
1995 - 1996 Tatra 613-4 Mi Long MODEL 95 (3rd facelift) - several dozens produced

Gallery

References

External links 

 Tatra a.s., official Tatra pages
 Tatra 613 info page
 Tatra 613: не только служба в КГБ | тест и история, Published 2019-11-24

Similar cars 
 Chevrolet Corvair

1980s cars
1990s cars
Cars powered by rear-mounted 8-cylinder engines
613
Cars introduced in 1974